The Kingdom of Pong or Pong Kingdom was an ethnically Tai state that controlled several smaller states along the frontier of what is now Myanmar and Assam.  

It was bounded on the north by the mountain ranges that divide present-day Myanmar and Assam State, in the south by Khambat, reaching to Yunnan in the east and the Chin Hills in the west. Its capital was Mogaung, known by the Shan people as Mongkawng.

History
Like most of Tai Yai history, the history of the Kingdom of Pong is largely legendary and existing chronicles and traditions include conflicting names and dates which have led to different interpretations.
According to ancient tradition the state of Pong has its origin in the legendary kingdom of Udiri Pale, founded in 58 BC.
The Manipuri chronicle of the region, titled the Cheitharol Kumbaba, written much later, mentions an alliance between the Kangleipak State and the Kingdom of Pong. It also mentions that the King of Pong visited Imphal in 698 AD and resided for some time in the town. The Kingdom of Pong is also mentioned among the conquests of Anoratha, the King of Pagan. Some scholars also identify the Kingdom of Pong with Mong Mao as well as with the kingdom of Lu-chuan/Ping-mian mentioned in Chinese chronicle Ming Shilu.

In the 13th century there was a dynastic squabble among different princes. Chukapha, one of those who had been prevented from becoming the ruler of Pong, left the country and found refuge in the Patkoi Hills, entering Assam through the Namrup river, a tributary of the Burhi Dihing. Chukapha took the name of 'Aham' meaning 'without equal' and name his subjects 'those without equal' giving origin to the Ahom people and the country of Assam.

The king of Pong Khek Khomba, together with king Senbi Kiyamba of Manipur, invaded Kyang Khambat in the Kabaw Valley in 1467.

See also
Ahom people
Manipur (princely state)

References

Bibliography

External links 
  Crucible of War: Burma and the Ming in the Tai Frontier Zone (1382–1454), by Jon Fernquest
Gazetteer of Upper Burma and the Shan states

Former countries in Asia
History of Myanmar
Tai history
Kachin State
Shan States